Latin Portuguese may refer to:

 Latin American Portuguese, or more specifically:
Brazilian Portuguese
Uruguayan Portuguese
 Latin–Portuguese, a pre-modern Portuguese orthography